Zara A. Wilson (born October 8, 1840) was a reformer and lawyer.

Early life and family

Zara Mahurin was born in Burnettsville, Indiana, on October 8, 1840. She was the fourth in a family of eight children. Her maiden name was Mahurin, to which form it had been Americanized from the Scotch Mac Huron. Her father, Caleb Mahurin (1786-1859), was of southern birth and education, a native of North Carolina. He was twice married, his second wife being Matilda C. Freeman (1809-1882), the mother of Wilson, to whom he was married near Troy, Ohio, in 1832.

Wilson's early life was spent on a farm, but she had the advantages of a seminary education in an institution founded and presided over by a half-brother, Isaac Mahurin (August 16, 1814 - August 23, 1870), in Fort Wayne, Indiana. Her sister, Mathilda L. Mahurin, was assistant principal. The Methodist College opened in 1852 and closed in 1863 when the Union Army claimed most of its students. The old brick building was on West Street and US 24.

Mathilda L. Mahurin (November 11, 1827 - April 16, 1916) was for many years a resident of Indianapolis, and taught in the public school there for many years. She was born in Miami County, Ohio, on November 11, 1827, and moved to Indiana with her parents when she was a girl. She began teaching when a young woman, being for a time connected with the Methodist College at Fort Wayne. She moved to Indianapolis in 1867 and lived with her sister, Mary Kilbun Robinson (1821-1909), whose home was at 603 North New Jersey Street. Mathilda Mahurin was an active member of Meridian Street M.E. Church and died at Elkhart, Indiana.

Zara Mahurin had always shown a fondness for books, and during her student days mathematics was to her a fascinating study.

Career
At the age of seventeen Zara Mahurin began to teach. After one year in Fort Wayne College, then in thriving condition, she became assistant in that school. The sudden death of her father called her home to the support of a sorrowing mother, whom she assisted, during the next year, in the settlement of a large estate. Then she resumed teaching and served with success in Lafayette and other towns of Indiana.

In Lafayette, Indiana, Wilson took her first public stand in favor of the equality of sex, refusing to accept a position as principal because the salary offered was ten dollars per month less than was paid to a man for the same work. She had already suffered from the disability custom had laid upon her sex. She had, in her earnest longing to do good, a strong desire to enter the ministry, but found that, because of sex, she would not be admitted to the Biblical Institute in Evansville, Indiana.

Wilson organized the Woman's Foreign Missionary Society of the Methodist Episcopal Church in Goodland, Indiana, and was corresponding secretary of that district until, her health demanding change of climate, the family home was removed to Lincoln, Nebraska, in 1870. She gradually improved in the climate of Nebraska. She was district corresponding secretary of the Woman's Foreign Missionary Society of the Methodist Episcopal Church in Nebraska.

Wilson was an efficient member of the Nebraska Woman's Christian Temperance Union, delivering addresses and publishing state reports. She was three times elected corresponding secretary of the Nebraska body, resigning because of overwork. For four years she was a member of the national convention. She was State superintendent or franchise for the Woman's Christian Temperance Union. In the fall of 1892 she was a candidate on the prohibition ticket for county attorney.

Wilson was always active in the cause of woman's advancement and was a warm advocate of woman's political enfranchisement, wielding a ready pen in its favor. Since her admission to the bar, in 1891, she made the legal status of women a specialty, and she wrote in that line for the press. She is the author of A Concise Compilation of Nebraska Laws, Of Special Interest to Women (1891).

In 1897 Wilson was nominated for Supreme Court justice by the Liberty Party, a Nebraska third-party organization.

Personal life
In the year 1867, Zara Mahurin married Port Wilson, a merchant of Goodland, Indiana. Owing to broken health, her energies were for ten years confined mostly to home duties and the care of her only child, a son.

References

1840 births
American feminists
American suffragists
American temperance activists
Woman's Christian Temperance Union people
Year of death missing
People from White County, Indiana
19th-century American lawyers
19th-century American women lawyers
Wikipedia articles incorporating text from A Woman of the Century
Woman's Foreign Missionary Society of the Methodist Episcopal Church